Tomikorosso is a village in the Mangodara Department of Comoé Province in south-western Burkina Faso. The village has a population of 464.

References

Populated places in the Cascades Region
Comoé Province